Noot may refer to:
 Van der Noot, surname
Noot Seear (born 1983), Canadian fashion model and actress
Noot vir Noot (Note for Note), an Afrikaans language musical quiz shown on South African television
"Noot", a vocalization on the Swiss-British children's television series Pingu
Noot., taxonomic author abbreviation of Hans Peter Nooteboom (born 1934), Dutch botanist